Florida Southern College (Florida Southern, Southern or FSC) is a private college in Lakeland, Florida. In 2019, the student population at FSC consisted of 3,073 students along with 130 full-time faculty members. The college offers 50 undergraduate majors and pre-professional programs, graduate programs in nursing, business, and education as well as post-graduate programs in nursing, education, and physical therapy.

Florida Southern is the home of the world's largest single-site collection of Frank Lloyd Wright architecture. For its 2011 and 2012 rankings, The Princeton Review selected Florida Southern's campus as the most beautiful in the country.

Florida Southern has won 30 national titles in NCAA Division II competition in several sports, men's golf (13 titles), baseball (9), women's golf (4), men's basketball (2), softball (1) and women's lacrosse (1). The college's official mascot is Mocsie the water moccasin, but they are also referenced by their nickname, the Mocs. The official primary colors of the college and its athletic teams are red and white, though dark blue and baby blue serve as secondary colors.

History
Florida Southern is the oldest four-year private college in the state of Florida. The college was first founded as South Florida Institute in Orlando, Florida in 1883, and moved to nearby Leesburg in 1885. Historians contend that the college's formal establishment occurred when it was sponsored by the United Methodist Church following the move to Leesburg in 1885. It was known as Florida Conference College.

The college moved to Sutherland (now Palm Harbor) in 1901, and changed its name to Southern College in 1906. Due to fires in the early 1920s, it was temporarily relocated to Clearwater Beach and then finally moved to its current location in Lakeland in 1922. In 1935 it was renamed Florida Southern College by the college's board of trustees. In 1966 the school enrolled its first Black student, Gwendolyn Gibson High.

Campus
The Florida Southern College Architectural District is listed on the National Register of Historic Places as a historic district due to the historical significance of its buildings. In 2012, the college became a part of the National Historic Landmarks of the United States. In 2011 and 2012, it was selected as the most beautiful campus in America by The Princeton Review. In September 2011, Travel+Leisure listed it as one of the most beautiful campuses in the United States and noted that it was put under watch by the World Monument Fund as an endangered cultural site.

Florida Southern commissioned Robert A. M. Stern, the dean of Yale's architecture program, to lead their expansion efforts in 2005. Stern is an accomplished American architect who won the Driehaus Architecture Prize in 2011. The Stern-designed Barnett Residential Life Center was completed in 2009. The complex includes Nicholas and Wesley Halls, and houses up to 235 students in lake-view rooms designed to complement Frank Lloyd Wright's existing architecture on campus. Marshall and Vera Lea Rinker bestowed to the school $1.5 million to construct a technology center in 2008. The 4,000 sq.ft. Rinker Technology Center opened in March 2010. According to Stern, his new buildings are intended to "honor Wright's historic legacy while putting my own mark on the campus by complementing, not copying, Wright." Stern also designed the Robert E. Christoverson Humanities and the Becker Business Building.

In addition to improving the campus proper, FSC also expanded outwardly by acquiring properties in adjacent neighborhoods. The college acquired the Lake Hollingsworth Apartments and Lake Morton Apartments which are about a 12-minute walking distance from campus. In 2011, the school bought, renovated, and furnished Lake Morton Apartments for $5.7 million. As part of the Pathway to Independence Program, upperclassmen and graduate students who are in good standing may be invited to live at this location.

Collection of Frank Lloyd Wright Architecture

Frank Lloyd Wright was an influential architect of the twentieth century. In 1938, the Florida Southern College president, Ludd M. Spivey, approached Wright with the task of transforming the 100-acre lakeside orange grove into a modern campus. The collection of Frank Lloyd Wright Architecture at Florida Southern College is called Child of the Sun. The name for the architecture came from Wright's idea of removing the "uninspired" buildings of the existing campus and replacing them with a campus that would, according to Wright, "grow out of the ground and into the light, a child of the sun." The works by Wright include the following:

 Annie Pfeiffer Chapel – First completed Frank Lloyd Wright building, begun 1938, dedicated 1941, French-door balconies restored in 2007
 Buckner Building (originally the E.T. Roux Library) – begun 1942, completed 1946
 Ordway Building (originally the Industrial Arts Building) – begun 1950, completed 1952
 Danforth Chapel – begun 1954, completed 1955
 Polk County Science Building (commonly known as Polk Science) – begun 1952, completed 1958
 Watson Fine Building (administration building) – begun 1946, completed 1949
 Water Dome – partially completed 1949, fully completed and restored in 2007 to Wright's original plans
 Three Seminars or The L A Raulerson Building (currently the Business Office) – begun 1940, completed 1942, and underwent renovations into one office building in 1958
 The Esplanades – various completion times, currently undergoing restoration around the campus
 Sharp Family Tourism and Education Center, also known as the Usonian House, a visitor center and exhibition space constructed according to Wright's 1939 designs for faculty housing

Residential life
Residence Halls
Allan Spivey (first-year, men)
Joseph-Reynolds (first-year, women)
Hollis 
Miller
Dell 
Jenkins
Publix Commons (includes all sorority houses and most fraternity houses)
Wesley Hall (first completed building of the Barnett Residential Life Center, completed Fall 2008)
Nicholas Hall (second building of the Barnett Residential Life Center, completed Fall 2009)
Colony Arms Apartments
Lake Morton Apartments
Lake Hollingsworth Apartments
Garden Apartments (completed 2016)
Star Apartments (completed 2021)
Mississippi Apartments

E.T. Roux Library
The E.T. Roux library, typically referred to as simply the "Roux Library," is located on the campus of Florida Southern College in Lakeland, FL. Designed by Frank Lloyd Wright for his Child of the Sun campus, the original Roux Library was built between the years of 1941–1945 at the cost of $120,000. The building is circular and housed a multi-tiered reading room in addition to library stacks. In March 1968, the new Roux Library opened in a different location on campus. The new location was designed by Nils Schweizer in a mid-century modern style. Schweitzer was a protege of Frank Lloyd Wright and went on to have a successful architectural career in the state of Florida.

After the Roux Library moved in 1968, the original building was renamed the Thad Buckner Building and was used for lectures, seminars, and was the visitor's center for the Child of the Sun campus. Today, the visitor's center has moved into a new location. The space is still used for lectures and can also be rented for private events. Typical of Frank Lloyd Wright style, the original Roux Library was constructed of reinforced concrete and concrete blocks. Long, narrow windows crown the concrete walls and interspersed throughout the concrete walls are small colorful cubes of glass that cast the sunlight in prismatic patterns.

The McKay Archives Center is located adjacent to the Roux Library. The archive is part of the same department as the Roux Library and maintains information on the history of Florida Southern College, alumni and faculty, in addition to its institutional records.

Academics
Florida Southern College has over 50 undergraduate majors in a variety of disciplines and offers the Bachelor of Arts, Bachelor of Science, Bachelor of Fine Arts, Bachelor of Music, Bachelor of Music Education, and Bachelor of Science in Nursing. At the graduate level, the school offers the degrees Master of Business Administration, Master of Accountancy, Master of Arts in Teaching, Master of Education, Master of Science in Nursing, Doctor of Physical Therapy, and a Doctorate in Educational Leadership. Florida Southern College is accredited by the Southern Association of Colleges and Schools Commission on Colleges to award bachelor's, master's, and doctoral degrees. For 2022, U.S. News & World Report ranked Florida Southern #8 in Regional Universities South, #8 in Best Undergraduate Teaching, and #14 in Best Value Schools. Florida Southern receives over 11,000 undergraduate applications annually and admits approximately 51% of applicants using a holistic admissions approach, with 2022 first year students having a 3.8 average high school GPA, a middle 50% test score range for the SAT of 1170 - 1310 and middle 50% ACT of 25 - 30. Florida Southern uses the learning style of engaged learning, in which the college incorporates engaging, hands-on experiences in every academic program. Florida Southern College was awarded the William M. Burke Presidential Award for Excellence in Experiential Education in 2010.

Barney Barnett School of Business and Free Enterprise
In 2011, the college announced an undisclosed contribution from Carol Jenkins Barnett ('79) (daughter of George W. Jenkins, founder of the Lakeland-based grocery chain Publix, for whom the school's gymnasium is named) in honor of her husband, Barney Barnett ('65). The funds would be used to establish the Barney Barnett School of Business and Free Enterprise. This gesture came shortly after Richard W. "Bill" Becker ('65) gifted $5 million to the School for the construction of a new undergraduate business building. Construction of the Becker Undergraduate Business Building and the Graduate and Executive Building was scheduled to begin late 2012 or early 2013. Like the Barnett Residential Life Center, these two buildings were also to be designed by architect Robert A. M. Stern

Undergraduate students at the Barnett School of Business and Free Enterprise study in one of six programs: accounting, business administration, business and free enterprise, finance and economics, healthcare administration, or political economy.  The school also allows students to focus on career tracks in finance, international business, management, marketing, and sport management. The Barnett School also offers the Master of Business Administration to full-time students in its 16-month accelerated program, as well as part-time students in the form of evening and Saturday classes.  The Barnett School of Business and Free Enterprise was accredited by AACSB-International in 2013.

School of Arts and Sciences
There are five primary disciplines within the school: communications, fine and performing arts, humanities, natural science and mathematics, and the social and behavioral sciences. The school features a combination of traditional programs and interdisciplinary studies that includes the opportunity for students to design their own major through the "Venture into Adventure" program. The citrus science program has the nation's only citrus bachelor's degree program, including courses taught by industry leaders.

Biology
The Division of Biology offers the Bachelor of Science degrees in biology, biochemistry and molecular biology (BMB; in conjunction with the Division of Chemistry), Environmental Studies, Integrative Biology, and Marine Biology. Research courses are required, giving students the opportunity to investigate, compile data and present their results at the semiannual Department of Natural Sciences Poster Competition.

Fine arts
The music department offers programs for degrees such as a Bachelor of Arts, Bachelor of Music in performance, Bachelor of Music Education, and Bachelor of Science in Music Management. The department maintains several large ensembles, including the wind ensemble, symphony band, jazz ensemble, symphony orchestra, and several choral groups. Each large ensemble is featured in concert at least once every semester through the Festival of Fine Arts. Smaller chamber ensembles include the flute choir, clarinet choir, saxophone choir, horn choir, trumpet choir, trombone choir, tuba choir, cello choir, viola choir, percussion ensemble, and vocal chamber ensemble. The opera theater usually produces one fully staged opera every academic year in collaboration with the Imperial Symphony Opera at the Branscomb Auditorium. The music faculty is a group of accomplished performers and teachers, who over the years have been joined by internationally acclaimed performers like Beverly Wolff and Robert MacDonald.
Branscomb Memorial Auditorium is located on the Frank Lloyd Wright campus of Florida Southern College in Lakeland, Florida.  Architect Nils Schweitzer, a protégé of Frank Lloyd Wright, designed the structure to complement Wright's original “Child of the Sun” concept.  Construction was completed in 1963.  Dedicated to Bishop John Branscomb of the Florida Conference of the United Methodist Church, the auditorium hosted its first performance in 1964.  Since that time, the Branscomb Memorial Auditorium stage has presented artists and performing groups from six continents through the college's annual Festival of Fine Arts series.  Not only is Branscomb Memorial Auditorium a historic structure, it is acoustically one of the very best concert halls in the United States.  With a natural audio reverberation time of approximately 1.3 seconds, it has been compared by many artists to Carnegie Hall.

The theater department puts on five main-stage shows a year in the Buckner Theater, including two musicals. A musical theatre major was added in Fall 2013. The college's Festival of Fine Arts is the longest-running theater and musical performance in Polk County and has hosted world-renowned artists Kathleen Battle, André Watts, I Musici di Roma, Jennifer Larmore, Sylvia McNair, and The Munich Symphony Orchestra. , Florida Southern College was rated #19 Best Theatre Program by the Princeton Review.

Athletics

Florida Southern's athletic teams are known as the Moccasins, often shortened to Mocs. Prior to 1926, Florida Southern athletes were known as the Southerners. The official colors are scarlet and white, though athletes sport red, white, and blue uniforms. Florida Southern is an NCAA Division II institution, the college's athletic teams participate in the Sunshine State Conference (SSC). Florida Southern has won 30 NCAA Division II championships. The Moccasins have won national titles in each of the last three seasons. The men's golf team won its 13th title in 2017; women's lacrosse won its first championship in 2016; and in 2015, the men's basketball team won its second overall national championship.

Men's sports
Baseball
Basketball
Cross country
Cheerleading
Esports - club
Golf
Ice Hockey - club
Lacrosse
Soccer
Swimming
Tennis
Track and field
Water Ski - club

Women's sports
Beach volleyball 
Basketball
Cheerleading
Cross country
Esports - club
Equestrian - club
Golf
Lacrosse
Soccer
Softball
Swimming
Tennis
Track and field
Volleyball
Water Ski - club

Student life
, Florida Southern College's student population consisted of 2,234 students, of which 2,200 were undergraduate students. The college offers a number of ways to participate in student life options including fraternities, sororities, student organizations and honor societies.

Convocation

Students are required to attend the quarterly Convocation, held in the Branscomb Auditorium. Past speakers include: Conservationist Jeff Corwin, Herbert Fisk Johnson III of S. C. Johnson, Jamie Tworkowski of To Write Love on Her Arms, New York Times' best-selling author Da Chen, and author-businessman Stephen Covey.

Greek life

Fraternities
 Theta Chi – Gamma Delta chapter, 1946, recolonization 2007, reinstalled 2009
 Sigma Chi – Epsilon Sigma chapter, 1959
 Lambda Chi Alpha – Epsilon Xi Zeta chapter, 1938
 Sigma Alpha Epsilon – Florida Gamma chapter, 1949
 Pi Kappa Alpha - Inactive since Fall 2021
 Alpha Gamma Rho – Gamma Alpha chapter, 2006
 Pi Kappa Phi – Beta Beta chapter, 1948, inactive 2001, recolonized 2011, refounded 2013

Sororities
 Alpha Chi Omega – Beta Omicron chapter, 1936
 Alpha Delta Pi – Gamma Gamma chapter, 1946
 Alpha Omicron Pi - Kappa Gamma chapter, inactive since Spring 2020
 Kappa Delta – Gamma Epsilon chapter, 1955
 Zeta Tau Alpha – Delta Beta chapter, 1957
 Gamma Phi Beta – Eta Beta chapter, 2010
 Delta Delta Delta – Epsilon Sigma chapter, 2017

Student organizations
The college has over 80 student organizations on campus, including: Studio Box (An Improv Comedy troupe who perform bi-weekly on Campus), Pi Sigma Alpha (Political Science Honorary), Sigma Tau Delta (English honors society), Beta Beta Beta (Biology Academic Fraternity), Delta Sigma Pi (Business Fraternity), Circle K International (Service Organization, college branch of Kiwanis), Delta Omicron (Chapter Alpha Phi, International Professional Music Fraternity), Southern Heat (Dance Team), Interlachen (Yearbook), The Southern (Newspaper), Omicron Delta Kappa (National Leadership Fraternity), Psi Chi (Psychology Fraternity), Sigma Rho Epsilon (Religious Community Service Fraternity), Theta Chi Beta (Gimel Chapter, Religion Honorary), and Phi Alpha Delta (Law Fraternity, International). FSC also has a number of Campus Ministries such as: Beyond, Fellowship of Christian Athletes, Newman Club (former Catholic campus ministry), Sandwich Ministry (ministry to the homeless community), Upper Room Ministries, and Wesley Fellowship (United Methodist Campus Ministry).

Notable alumni

Notable alumni include athletes such as Major League outfielder Matt Joyce, first baseman Lance Niekro, pitcher Rob Dibble, infielder Greg Pryor, and pitcher Brett Tomko, as well as professional golfers Lee Janzen, Rocco Mediate and U.S. Women's Open champion Kathy Cornelius. Alexi Cortez currently plays professional indoor soccer for the Lakeland Tropics, whose head coach is alumnus Clay Roberts. Numerous leaders of the citrus industry also attended FSC including Citrus Hall of Fame inductee C. D. Atkins. Actress Charleene Closshey graduated from FSC as a business major in 2002. Other graduates include judges, politicians, a secretary general of OPEC, a U.S. State Department spokesperson, CEOs, correspondents, lawyers, and bishops.

See also
Independent Colleges and Universities of Florida

References

External links
Official website
Official athletics website

 
Educational institutions established in 1883
Frank Lloyd Wright buildings
Universities and colleges accredited by the Southern Association of Colleges and Schools
Universities and colleges in Lakeland, Florida
Universities and colleges in Polk County, Florida
1883 establishments in Florida
Private universities and colleges in Florida
Florida Southern Moccasins football
American football teams established in 1912
American football teams disestablished in 1935
1912 establishments in Florida
1935 disestablishments in Florida